The following is a list of the 158 battles inscribed on the Arc de Triomphe in Paris, which were fought by the French First Republic and the First French Empire between 1792 and 1815:

 The names of 96 battles are engraved on the inner façades of the monument, under the great arches (24 on each of the four pillars).
 The names of 32 battles are engraved on the inner façades of the monument, under the small arches (8 on each of the four pillars).
 The names of 30 battles are engraved on the attic (11 on each of the long façades and 4 on each of the short ones).

Additionally, some of these battles are represented in low relief on the inner and outer façades of the monument:

 On the inner façades of the monument, under the small arches, four low reliefs list the names of 16 battles (6 on the low relief on the northern pillar, 4 on the low reliefs on the eastern and southern pillars, 2 on the low relief on the western pillar).
 On the outer façades of the monument, 5 battles are represented in low relief (2 on the northern façade facing the Avenue de la Grande Armée, 1 on each of the other façades).

Related list: Names inscribed under the Arc de Triomphe.

Great arches 

The names of the 96 battles inscribed under the great arches

Small arches 

The names of the 8 battles inscribed on the inner façade of the northern pillar

The names of the 8 battles inscribed on the inner façade of the eastern pillar

The names of the 8 battles inscribed on the inner façade of the southern pillar

The names of the 8 battles inscribed on the inner façade of the western pillar

Attic 

The names of the 30 battles inscribed on the shields of the attic

Low reliefs

Inner low reliefs 

The names of the 16 battles inscribed on the tablets of the inner low reliefs

Outer low reliefs 

The names of the 5 battles represented in low relief on the outer façades

See also 
 Names inscribed under the Arc de Triomphe

References

Further reading 

 

Lists of battles
Paris-related lists